The post of Mayor of Reykjavík was created in 1907 and advertised in 1908. Páll Einarsson and Knud Zimsen applied for the job and Páll got the position for a period of six years, at the end of which he did not wish to renew his tenure. Rather than a direct election, Reykjavík City Council members elect the mayor from within their ranks.

Between 1932 and 1994 the centre-right Independence Party dominated Reykjavík municipal politics, but since then other parties have been more competitive. Since 2003 seven people have held the mayor position, due to an unprecedented amount of instability in Reykjavík's municipal coalition government caused in part by the 2008–11 Icelandic financial crisis.

The incumbent mayor is Dagur Bergþóruson Eggertsson, who was elected in 2014. Dagur's Social Democratic Alliance currently governs the city as the senior coalition partner with the Pirate Party, Reform and the Left-Greens.

List of mayors

See also
 Timeline of Reykjavík

References

Reykjavik.is - Borgarstjórar í Reykjavík frá upphafi (Mayors of Reykjavík since the beginning, in Icelandic)

Reykjavik